Gulo is a genus of mammal.

GULO is the enzyme L-gulonolactone oxidase.

Gulo or GULO may also refer to:
Gul Mohammad Pahalwan, 1990s Uzbek leader known as Gulo

People with the surname
Aleksei Gulo (born 1973), Russian footballer